Lafayette Township is one of twelve townships in Coles County, Illinois, USA.  As of the 2010 census, its population was 4,822 and it contained 2,285 housing units. The Coles County Memorial Airport is located in this township.

Geography

Cities, towns, villages
 Charleston (west edge)
 Mattoon (east quarter)

Extinct towns
 Jones
 Loxa
 Newby
 Rolling Green

Cemeteries
The township contains three cemeteries: Bethel, Montgomery and Rest Haven Memorial Gardens.

Major highways
  Interstate 57
  Illinois Route 16

Airports and landing strips
 Coles County Memorial Airport

Demographics

School districts
 Charleston Community Unit School District 1
 Mattoon Community Unit School District 2

Political districts
 Illinois' 15th congressional district
 State House District 110
 State Senate District 55

References
 
 United States Census Bureau 2007 TIGER/Line Shapefiles
 United States National Atlas

External links
 City-Data.com
 Illinois State Archives

Adjacent townships 

Townships in Coles County, Illinois
Townships in Illinois